Aedes (Neomacleaya) petroelephantus, or Verrallina (Neomacleaya) petroelephantus, is a species complex of zoophilic mosquito belonging to the genus Aedes. It is endemic to Sri Lanka

References

External links
MOSQUITO STUDIES IN THE INDIAN SUBREGION
Neomacleaya Theobald, 1907 - Mosquito Taxonomic Inventory
Index of currently recognized mosquito species (Diptera: Culicidae)

petroelephantus
Insects described in 1951